is an aerospace museum in the city of Komatsu, Ishikawa Prefecture, Japan. It is located next to Komatsu Airport.

Aircraft on display
 Sikorsky S-61 (HSS-2B)
 Fuji KM-2
 F-104J Starfighter
 Lockheed T-33A
 Pilatus PC-6 Porter
 Dornier Do 28
 Hughes OH-6J Cayuse
 Hughes TH-55J Osage
 Beechcraft E33 Bonanza
 Bell 47G
 Mitsubishi F-2 (mockup)
 Mitsubishi T-2
 Pitts Special S-2B

References

External links

Ishikawa Sightseeing Guide

Museums in Ishikawa Prefecture
Aerospace museums in Japan
Prefectural museums
Komatsu, Ishikawa